Ranesh Das Gupta (15 January 1912 – 4 November 1997) was a Bangladeshi writer, journalist, and politician. He was posthumously awarded the Ekushey Padak in 1998 by the Government of Bangladesh. He was one of the founders of the cultural organization Bangladesh Udichi Shilpigoshthi.

Background and education
Gupta was born to Apurboratna Dasgupta and Indroprova Devi. He got his early education from Pathshala of Ramananda Pundit in Purulia. In 1929, he passed matriculation from Bankura Zilla School and passed ISC examination from Kolkata City College.

Career

Gupta started his career as a journalist at the weekly Sonar Bangla. In 1958, he was elected a Commissioner of Dhaka City Corporation. He was jailed for his political views for nine years. He worked in The Sangbad.

Along with Satyen Sen, Gupta founded the cultural organization Bangladesh Udichi Shilpigoshthi on 29 October 1968.

Works
 Upanyaser Shilparup
 Shilpir Swadhinatar Proxne
 Latin Americar Mukti Sangram
 Sedin Sakale Dhakai
 Rahmaner Ma and Anyanna
 Muktidhara
 Samyabadi Utthan
 Sajjad Jahir
 Kakhano Champa Kakhono Atosi

References

1912 births
1997 deaths
People from Dibrugarh district
Recipients of the Ekushey Padak
Bangladeshi male writers
Bangladeshi politicians
Bangladeshi journalists
20th-century journalists